South Africa competed at the 2012 Summer Olympics in London, United Kingdom, from 27 July to 12 August 2012. This was the nation's eighteenth participation overall and sixth consecutive appearance at the Summer Olympics in the post-apartheid era. The South African Sports Confederation and Olympic Committee (SASCOC) sent a total of 125 athletes to the Games, 67 men and 58 women, to compete in 17 sports. Field hockey and women's football were the only team-based sports in which South Africa were representation at these Olympic games. There was only a single competitor in archery, BMX cycling, judo, shooting and weightlifting.

Notable South African athletes included track stars Oscar Pistorius and Caster Semenya. Pistorius, a four-time Paralympic champion, set South Africa's historical record as the first double-leg amputee to compete at the Olympics. Semenya, a middle-distance runner and a world champion who had been subjected to gender testing in 2009, became the nation's flag bearer at the opening ceremony. The South African team also featured past Olympic medalists, including swimmer Roland Mark Schoeman, who won a full set of medals in Athens, and long jumper Godfrey Khotso Mokoena, who took silver in Beijing.

After suffering a major setback in Beijing, South Africa recaptured its previous successes in London with a total of six Olympic medals (four gold, one silver, and one bronze). Among the nation's medalists were swimmers Cameron van der Burgh and Chad le Clos, who each won gold in their events, with Le Clos also winning a silver. Van der Burgh broke both an Olympic record and a world record in men's breaststroke swimming. Meanwhile, le Clos surpassed the defending champion Michael Phelps to claim the title in one of the men's butterfly events. For the first time in its history, South Africa won Olympic medals in rowing and in sprint canoeing.

Medalists

| width=78% align=left valign=top |

|width=22% align=left valign=top |

Archery

Athletics

South African athletes have entered the following events:

Key
 Note – Ranks given for track events are within the athlete's heat only
 Q = Qualified for the next round
 q = Qualified for the next round as a fastest loser or, in field events, by position without achieving the qualifying target
 NR = National record
 N/A = Round not applicable for the event
 Bye = Athlete not required to compete in round

Men
Ofentse Mogawane was injured in a crash during the first heat of the 4 × 400 m relay. On appeal, South Africa was entered into the final with Louis van Zyl replacing Mogawane. Oscar Pistorius made Olympic history, becoming the first double leg amputee ever to participate in the Olympic Games.

Track & road events

* Allowed into final on appeal

Field events

Combined events – Decathlon

Women
Track & road events

Field events

Badminton

Boxing

South Africa has entered boxers for the following events

Men

Canoeing

Sprint
South Africa has entered canoeists for the following events

Qualification Legend: FA = Qualify to final (medal); FB = Qualify to final B (non-medal)

Cycling

South Africa has entered nine cyclists.

Road

Track
Sprint

Mountain biking

BMX

Equestrian

Eventing

Field hockey

South Africa has qualified for both the men's and the women's event.

 Men's team event – 1 team of 16 players
 Women's team event – 1 team of 16 players

Men's tournament

Roster

Group play

11th/12th place

Women's tournament

Roster

Group play

9th/10th place

Football

South Africa is qualified for the women's event.

 Women's team event – 1 team of 18 players

Women's tournament

Team roster

Group play

Judo

Rowing

South Africa has entered the following events.
Men

Women

Qualification Legend: FA=Final A (medal); FB=Final B (non-medal); FC=Final C (non-medal); FD=Final D (non-medal); FE=Final E (non-medal); FF=Final F (non-medal); SA/B=Semifinals A/B; SC/D=Semifinals C/D; SE/F=Semifinals E/F; QF=Quarterfinals; R=Repechage

Sailing

South Africa has entered one boat for the following event.

Men

M = Medal race; EL = Eliminated – did not advance into the medal race;

Shooting

South Africa has entered one competitor in shooting;

Men

Swimming

Twenty South African swimmers have entered the following events:

Men

Women

Triathlon

South Africa has entered one man and two women.

Volleyball

Beach

Weightlifting

South Africa has entered one weightlifter.

See also
South Africa at the 2012 Summer Paralympics
South Africa at the 2012 Winter Youth Olympics

References

Nations at the 2012 Summer Olympics
2012
Summer Olympics